Victoria County is a county located in the U.S. state of Texas. As of the 2020 census, its population was 91,319. Its county seat is Victoria. Victoria County is included in the Victoria, TX Metropolitan Statistical Area.

History

 Paleo-Indians Hunter-gatherers, and later Tonkawa, Aranamas, Tamiques, Karankawa. Tawakoni, Lipan Apache and Comanche, first inhabitants.
 1685 René-Robert Cavelier, Sieur de La Salle establishes Fort St. Louis.
 1689 Alonso de Leon names the Guadalupe River in honor of Our Lady of Guadalupe.
 1722 Nuestra Señora de Loreto Presidio and Mission Nuestra Señora del Espíritu Santo de Zúñiga  become the first Spanish settlement in Victoria County.
 1824  Nuestra Señora de Guadalupe de Jesús Victoria (the future city of Victoria) is established by Martín De León, who starts his colony with 5,000 branded cattle and establishes the county's claim as the "Cradle of the Texas Cattle Industry." The only primarily Mexican colony in Texas.
 1835 Victoria's settlers supported the revolution against Antonio López de Santa Anna, but were ostracized by new incoming Americans, many of whom were adventurous soldiers or fortune hunters, who wrongly profiled them as Mexican sympathizers and forced them to flee after the revolution in 1836. Anglo-Americans resettle the area.
 1836 Victory County is formed by the Republic of Texas. It is named after Guadalupe Victoria, the first President of Mexico. Three thousand troops of the Texas army encamp near Spring Creek, Victoria County, under the command of Gen. Thomas J. Rusk, as the main defense against a threatened attack by Mexican general José de Urrea.
 1842 Rafael Vásquez and Adrián Woll lead Mexican forces in an invasion into the county.
 1850 Coletoville is established by German immigrant Carl Steiner.
 1851 Victoria County's first toll bridge is  erected across the river, built by Richard Owens and Sylvester Sutton.
 1860 There are 1,413 slaves in the county.
 1861 County votes 318–88 in favor of secession from the Union. Victoria County sends 300 men to fight for the Confederate States Army.
 1863 Confederate General John B. Magruder destroys the railroad from Port Lavaca to Victoria to keep it out of Union hands. He also sinks trees and boats into the Guadalupe River.
 1867-1869 The county is occupied by federal troops.  Mob mentality violence by those same troops results in the axing death and corpse mutilation of local official Benjamin F. Hill, who is at the time incarcerated for an alleged self-defense killing of a discharged Union soldier.
 1873 Gulf, Western Texas and Pacific Railway connects Victoria with Cuero and the coast.
 1882 New York, Texas and Mexican Railway provides the first cross-country route to Rosenberg Junction in Fort Bend County.
 1883 Texas Continental Meat Company is erected in the county and is the largest meat packing plant in Texas.
 1886 Bray's Ferry is established at the San Antonio River by G. B. Amery and John Bray.
 1906 The Guadalupe River Navigation Company is established.
 1930 Oil is discovered at the McFaddin Oil Field. Victoria County holds more cattle than any other county in Texas.
 1941 Foster Air Force Base is established as Victoria Army Air Field as a training air field.
 1967 The Victoria Barge Canal is completed, connecting Victoria County with the Intracoastal Waterway.

Demographics

As of the 2020 United States census, there were 91,319 people, 32,520 households, and 22,172 families residing in the county.

As of the census of 2000, there were 84,088 people, 30,071 households, and 22,192 families residing in the county.  The population density was 95 people per square mile (37/km2).  There were 32,945 housing units at an average density of 37 per square mile (14/km2).  The racial makeup of the county was 74.22% White, 6.30% Black or African American, 0.53% Native American, 0.77% Asian, 0.04% Pacific Islander, 15.92% from other races, and 2.22% from two or more races.  39.20% of the population were Hispanic or Latino of any race. 16.2% were of German, 6.2% American and 5.6% English ancestry according to Census 2000. 73.3% spoke English and 25.5% Spanish as their first language.

There were 30,071 households, out of which 37.20% had children under the age of 18 living with them, 56.70% were married couples living together, 12.70% had a female householder with no husband present, and 26.20% were non-families. 22.40% of all households were made up of individuals, and 9.10% had someone living alone who was 65 years of age or older.  The average household size was 2.75 and the average family size was 3.23.

In the county, the population was spread out, with 29.10% under the age of 18, 9.20% from 18 to 24, 28.10% from 25 to 44, 21.50% from 45 to 64, and 12.00% who were 65 years of age or older.  The median age was 34 years. For every 100 females, there were 94.90 males.  For every 100 females age 18 and over, there were 91.70 males.

The median income for a household in the county was $38,732, and the median income for a family was $44,443. Males had a median income of $35,484 versus $21,231 for females. The per capita income for the county was $18,379.  About 10.50% of families and 12.90% of the population were below the poverty line, including 17.20% of those under age 18 and 11.70% of those age 65 or over.

Geography

Major highways
  U.S. Highway 59
  Interstate 69 is currently under construction and will follow the current route of U.S. 59 in most places northeast of Victoria.
  Interstate 69W is currently under construction and will follow the current route of U.S. 59 in most places southwest of Victoria.
  U.S. Highway 77
  Interstate 69E is currently under construction and will follow the current route of U.S. 77 in most places southwest of Victoria.
  U.S. Highway 87
  Farm to Market Road 444
  Farm to Market Road 616
  Farm to Market Road 622

Adjacent counties
 Lavaca County (north)
 Jackson County (northeast)
 Calhoun County (southeast)
 Refugio County (south)
 Goliad County (southwest)
 DeWitt County (northwest)

Politics

County government

Victoria County elected officials

Communities

City
 Victoria (county seat)

Census-designated places
 Bloomington
 Inez
 Placedo
 Quail Creek

Unincorporated communities
 McFaddin
 Nursery
 Telferner
 Moursund

See also
 Kentucky Mutt Creek
 List of museums in the Texas Gulf Coast
 National Register of Historic Places listings in Victoria County, Texas
 Recorded Texas Historic Landmarks in Victoria County

References

External links

 Victoria County government's website
 Victoria Economic Development Corporation economic development
 
 "Victoria County Profile" from the Texas Association of Counties
 Texas Beyond History, Morhiss Mound

 
1836 establishments in the Republic of Texas
Populated places established in 1836
Victoria, Texas metropolitan area